Route Views is a project founded by Advanced Network Technology Center at the University of Oregon to allow Internet users to view global Border Gateway Protocol routing information from the perspective of other locations around the internet. Originally created to help Internet Service Providers determine how their network prefixes were viewed by others in order to debug and optimize access to their network, Route Views is now used for a range of other purposes such as academic research.

Route Views servers get their information by peering directly with other BGP routers, typically at large Internet exchange points. The servers can be accessed via telnet or SSH.

External links
Route Views homepage

Internet architecture
Network management